Fannyhessea vaginae is a species of bacteria in the family Atopobiaceae. It is a facultative anaerobic, Gram-positive rod-shaped or elliptical coccobacillus found as single elements or in pairs or short chains. It is typically isolated from 80% of women with bacterial vaginosis and it is implicated in treatment failures. Invasive infections such as bacteremia have been reported.

References

Further reading

External links
 LPSN
 
 Type strain of Atopobium vaginae at BacDive -  the Bacterial Diversity Metadatabase

Coriobacteriaceae
Bacterial vaginosis
Bacteria described in 1999